Wudu is a railway station on the Taiwan Railways Administration West Coast line located in Xizhi District, New Taipei, Taiwan.

History
The station was opened on 1 June 1902, during Japanese rule. The station is now mostly used by commuters to and from Keelung and Taipei, and the only trains that stop here are the local trains.

See also
 List of railway stations in Taiwan

References

External links

 TRA Wudu Station
 Taiwan Railways Administration

1902 establishments in Taiwan
Railway stations in New Taipei
Railway stations opened in 1902
Railway stations served by Taiwan Railways Administration